Walram, Count of Jülich (1240/45 – c. August 1297, after Battle of Furnes) was the second son of William IV, Count of Jülich and Richardis of Guelders, daughter of Gerard III, Count of Guelders.

Biography
In 1278, Walram succeeded his father as Count of Jülich when his father and his elder brother, William, were slain together in Aachen.  He served as Provost at Aachen as late as 1279/1280.  Walram was a fierce opponent of the Archbishop of Cologne and a partisan of the Duke of Brabant in the War of succession for Limburg.  In the Battle of Woeringen in 1288 he captured Archbishop Siegfried, which enabled him to gain supremacy over the Archbishop.  He won Zülpich among others and secured his other fiefs.

Walram was wounded at the Battle of Furnes on 20 August 1297, and died several days later.

Family and children
In 1296, Walram married Marie of Brabant-Aarschot (c. 1278 – 25 February 1332), daughter of Godfrey of Brabant and Jeanne, dame de Vierzon.  Marie was the heiress of both Aarschot and Vierzon.  Walram died the year after their marriage and his brother Gerhard succeeded him as Count of Jülich.  Marie married again in 1323 to Robert of Beaumont and at her death Vierzon went to her sister Elisabeth who had married Walram's brother Gerhard.  Walram and Marie had:
William (1297/98 – 31 October 1311), Canon of St. Marian at Aachen

References

Sources

External links 
 Genealogie-Mittelalter.de
 Lower Rhine Nobility

1297 deaths
Counts of Jülich
Year of birth uncertain